Citharichthys is a genus of flatfish in the large-tooth flounder family, Paralichthyidae. They have both eyes on the left sides of their heads. They are native to the oceans around the Americas, with a single species, C. stampflii off the West African coast. Most are found in relatively shallow depths, but the genus also includes species found in deep water (down to at least ) and species that enter fresh water.

Various species known as sanddab, whiff, and flounder are in this genus, and the most common species is the Pacific sanddab, Citharichthys sordidus. They are a dull light-brown, and are mottled with brown or black, sometimes with yellow or orange. The largest species reaches  in length.

Species
The currently recognized species in this genus are:
 Citharichthys abbotti C. E. Dawson, 1969 (Veracruz whiff)
 Citharichthys amblybregmatus Gutherz & Blackman, 1970
 Citharichthys arctifrons Goode, 1880 (Gulf Stream flounder)
 Citharichthys arenaceus Evermann & M. C. Marsh, 1900 (sand whiff)
 Citharichthys cornutus (Günther, 1880) (horned whiff)
 Citharichthys darwini Victor & Wellington, 2013 (Darwin's sanddab)
 Citharichthys dinoceros Goode & T. H. Bean, 1886 (spined whiff)
 Citharichthys fragilis C. H. Gilbert, 1890 (Gulf sanddab)
 Citharichthys gilberti O. P. Jenkins & Evermann, 1889 (bigmouth sanddab)
 Citharichthys gnathus Hoshino & Amaoka, 1999
 Citharichthys gordae Beebe & Tee-Van, 1938 (mimic sanddab)
 Citharichthys gymnorhinus Gutherz & Blackman, 1970 (anglefin whiff)
 Citharichthys macrops Dresel, 1885 (spotted whiff)
 Citharichthys mariajorisae van der Heiden & Mussot-Pérez, 1995 (five-rayed sanddab)
 Citharichthys minutus Cervigón, 1982
 Citharichthys platophrys C. H. Gilbert, 1891 (small sanddab)
 Citharichthys sordidus (Girard, 1854) (Pacific sanddab)
 Citharichthys spilopterus Günther, 1862 (bay whiff)
 Citharichthys stampflii (Steindachner, 1894) (smooth flounder)
 Citharichthys stigmaeus D. S. Jordan & C. H. Gilbert, 1882 (speckled sanddab)
 Citharichthys surinamensis (Bloch & J. G. Schneider, 1801)
 Citharichthys uhleri D. S. Jorda], 1889 (voodoo whiff)
 Citharichthys valdezi Cervigón, 1986
 Citharichthys xanthostigma C. H. Gilbert, 1890 (longfin sanddab)

References

 
Extant Miocene first appearances
Marine fish genera
Taxa named by Pieter Bleeker